The McGuire Nuclear Station is a nuclear power plant located about  northwest of Charlotte, North Carolina, on the state's largest lake, Lake Norman.  It is a  lake created in 1963 by Duke Power for the Cowans Ford Hydroelectric Station.  The McGuire units use the lake's water for cooling.

This plant has two Westinghouse pressurized water reactors and has a capability to produce 2,250 megawatts of net power, with a net generation of 17,514 GW·h in 2005.  This represents 44% of the total nuclear power generation for the state of North Carolina.

Ownership
McGuire Nuclear Station is operated by Duke Power Company and owned by the Duke Energy Corporation.  It is named for William McGuire, who served as president of Duke Power from 1959 to 1971.

License
The original operating licenses' dates of expiration were 2021-06-12 for Unit 1 and  2023-03-03 for Unit 2.
In 2003, the Nuclear Regulatory Commission (NRC) renewed the licenses for both reactors for an additional twenty years.

Electricity Production

Surrounding population

The 2010 U.S. population within  of McGuire was 199,869, an increase of 66.8 percent in a decade, according to an analysis of U.S. Census data for msnbc.com. The 2010 U.S. population within  was 2,850,782, an increase of 23.3 percent since 2000. Cities within 50 miles include Charlotte (17 miles to city center).

Ice Condensers
The McGuire Nuclear Station uses ice condensers as part of its emergency containment systems. A nuclear plant ice condenser is a passive, static heat sink that relies on large quantities of ice to mitigate severe accidents. Ice condensers are designed to limit pressure in the event of an accidental steam release. This design allows smaller containment structures and reduced material requirements.

Seismic risk
The NRC's estimate of the risk each year of an earthquake intense enough to cause core damage to the reactor at McGuire was 1 in 32,258, according to an NRC study published in August 2010.

Stator replacement project
During 2014 McGuire Nuclear Station powered down one of its units to undergo a routine refueling outage, critical to the operation of the plant. This outage was particularly significant because McGuire performed a major evolution – the replacement of a generator stator. The stator is part of the electric generator and is among the largest and heaviest components in the plant, weighing approximately 1.2 million pounds. The work was carried out by Siemens Energy Inc. The lifting contractor was Sarens who used a structural temporary lifting system to remove the existing Stator and install the new Stator. A specialist engineering company named Lowther-Rolton performed a "Technical Audit" of the lifting and installation engineering to ensure safety of operations. Lowther-Rolton were the original developers of the Technical Audit system for load movement operations.

See also

List of largest power stations in the United States

References

External links
Official Site From Duke Energy

Energy infrastructure completed in 1981
Energy infrastructure completed in 1984
Buildings and structures in Mecklenburg County, North Carolina
Nuclear power plants in North Carolina
Nuclear power stations using pressurized water reactors
Duke Energy
1981 establishments in North Carolina